Alliance University is a non-profit private university that was established in the State of Karnataka by act no. 34 of year 2010 under the recognition of University Grants Commission of Ministry of Education (India) (MoE). The university offers undergraduate, postgraduate and doctoral programmes in the academic disciplines of business, engineering, technology, liberal arts, applied mathematics, commerce, law and executive education under the aegis of its flagship constituent colleges Alliance School of Business, Alliance College of Engineering and Design, Alliance School of Law, Alliance Ascent College, Alliance School of Liberal Arts, and the Alliance School of Applied Mathematic.

History and governance

Alliance University grew out of the "Alliance Business School", which was founded around 2005 and in turn grew out of the "Alliance Business Academy", which had been founded in the mid-1990s. Madhukar G. Angur, then the faculty of University of Michigan, was an Honorary Dean of the Alliance Business School and his brother, Sudhir G. Angur, was the President.

Alliance University was the first private university in the state of Karnataka and in South India. It was established under the Karnataka State legislation.  The sponsoring body of the university is Alliance Business School Pvt. Ltd, run by the Angur family, and until 2016 the university's chancellor was Madhukar G. Angur.

As of 2016 it had around 6,500 students studying under its flagship constituent colleges.

In March 2021 Premanand Shetty was appointed as the Chancellor, Abhay G. Chebbi as the Pro Chancellor, and Anubha Singh as the Vice Chancellor of the university.

Constituent units

Academics 

The university offers baccalaureate concentrations, postgraduate offerings, doctoral degree programs and several professional certificate programs; University conducts educational programmes leading to the degree of Bachelor of Technology (B.Tech.), Master of Technology (M.Tech.), Bachelor of Business Administration (BBA), Master of Business Administration (MBA), Bachelor of Commerce (Hons.) (B.Com.), Integrated Bachelor of Laws (Hons.) with Arts (BA, LLB), Integrated Bachelors of Law (Hons.) with Business Administration (BBA, LLB), Master of Laws (LLM) and Doctor of Philosophy (Ph.D.) in business, engineering, sciences, law and other interdisciplinary areas. In addition to the full-time programmes, the university offers a wide variety of on-campus and flexi mode executive education programmes leading to the diploma of Executive Post Graduate Diploma in Management (EPGDM).

Admissions 

Alliance University admission processes and eligibility criteria are respect to merit basis. The admission process is based on the course candidate opts for with following parameters of evaluation considering the applicants'
 Past Academic Performance
 Nationalized or University Entrance Test Score (Alliance University Scholastic Aptitude Test)
 Versatility and Achievements
 Oral Extempore
 Essay Composition followed by a Personal Interview.

Alliance University also conducts its university entrance test and personal interview in Ahmedabad, Mumbai, Bangalore, Chennai, Hyderabad, Kolkata, & New Delhi cities on every academic year.

Rankings

The National Institutional Ranking Framework (NIRF) ranked Alliance College of Engineering and Design at 159 among engineering colleges in 2020. It ranked Alliance School of Business at 39 among business schools in 2020. Outlook India ranked Alliance School of Business 16 among private business schools in India in 2020.

Alumni

Alliance Alumni Association (AAA) manages interactions with the alumni of the university. Alumni Reunion, a yearly event serves as a rendezvous. Some of the prominent alumni include entrepreneur and philanthropist Rajashree Birla and Nobel laureate Kailash Satyarthi.

Leadership disputes

As early as 2014 disputes within the Angur family began interrupting the management of the university; in 2015 Madhukar G. Angur removed his brother, sister, and other family members from the board and filed police charges that they had stolen money and mismanaged the university.

In February 2016 Madhukar G. Angur was arrested on rape charges, then released, and further rape allegations were made again in the next month.

Around April 2016 Madhukar G. Angur was fired as chancellor and replaced by his brother, Sudhir G. Angur, and by June the power struggle within the family for control led to the university being closed for two weeks and semester-end exams were indefinitely postponed.  The university went on holidays two more times in 2016;  in September Madhukar Angur forcibly took back the chancellorship, and the next month his brother forcibly took it back.

Government intervention
In November 2016 a government-appointed investigation by M.I. Savadatti reported that it found that between 2010 and 2016 Madhukar G. Angur had been "deeply involved in committing huge financial irregularities causing wrongful loss to Alliance University a total amount of INR 107 Crore" (around US$14 million).

Students and their families began to request refunds, and appealed to the government of Karnataka to intervene.  The government had no legal right to intervene in a private university, and in November worked to change the law so that it could. In December 2017 the government appointed an administrator with unspecified tenure and said that the Angurs could no longer be involved in managing the operations of the university.

As of March 2018 litigation between family members over control of the university was pending in the High Court.

References

External links 

 

Business schools in Bangalore
Private universities in India
Educational institutions established in 2010
2010 establishments in Karnataka